The 1953 Dutch Grand Prix was a Formula Two race held on 7 June 1953 at the Circuit Zandvoort. It was race 3 of 9 in the 1953 World Championship of Drivers, which was run to Formula Two rules in 1952 and 1953, rather than the Formula One regulations normally used. The 90-lap race was won by Ferrari driver Alberto Ascari after he started from pole position. His teammate Nino Farina finished second and Maserati drivers José Froilán González and Felice Bonetto came in third

Race report

The Dutch Grand Prix, which had been held in August the previous year, moved to an earlier June calendar slot in 1953. Ferrari retained the same four drivers who had competed at Buenos Aires—Alberto Ascari, Luigi Villoresi, Nino Farina and Mike Hawthorn—while there was also a privateer Ferrari for Frenchman Louis Rosier. The Scuderia's most significant competition came from the Maserati team, who came to Zandvoort with three of their four drivers from the Argentine Grand Prix: Juan Manuel Fangio, José Froilán González and Felice Bonetto. Swiss driver Toulo de Graffenried raced in a privateer Maserati for Enrico Platé's team. Gordini also entered three cars for this event, with Maurice Trintignant and Harry Schell (who had shared Trintignant's car at Buenos Aires) being retained from their lineup for Argentina. Roberto Mieres made his Grand Prix debut in the team's third car. The Connaught works team retained Kenneth McAlpine and Stirling Moss from their lineup for the previous European race, the Italian Grand Prix, while fellow British driver Roy Salvadori also drove for the team, and Johnny Claes entered a privateer Connaught. HWM also stuck with the drivers who had competed for them in Monza—Peter Collins and Lance Macklin—while Ken Wharton completed the field in his privateer Cooper-Bristol.

Ascari took his fifth consecutive pole position (excluding the Indy 500, in which none of the European teams competed), and he was joined on the front row by Fangio in his Maserati and the second Ferrari of Farina. Villoresi in the third Ferrari started from the second row, alongside the Maserati of González, while the third row consisted of Hawthorn in the remaining works Ferrari and a pair of privateers—de Graffenried in a Maserati and Rosier in his Ferrari. The final works Maserati of Bonetto could only manage to qualify on the fifth row of the grid, starting from thirteenth.

The race was held in very difficult conditions – the track was made slippery by loose grit. The Ferraris had better road holding and once again Alberto Ascari led from start to finish, while the main competition for second place was between his teammates Farina and Villoresi. Farina ultimately finished second, while Villoresi, who took the point for fastest lap, was forced to retire with a throttle issue. A problem with his suspension forced González to retire. Three laps later, however, he took over his teammate Felice Bonetto's car and ran out the winner of an exciting duel with Mike Hawthorn, once again depriving Ferrari of a 1-2-3. González and Bonetto shared the four points for third place. Fangio retired with a broken back axle, having been in fourth behind the leading Ferrari trio at the time. Toulo de Graffenried took the final points position in fifth, his first points since the 1951 Swiss Grand Prix.

Ascari's eight consecutive World Championship race victory (ignoring the Indianapolis 500) gave him a clear lead in the points standings. He was eight points clear of Bill Vukovich, the winner at Indianapolis, while his nearest genuine rivals for the Drivers' Championship were his teammates Villoresi and Farina, who were in third and fourth, respectively. González and Hawthorn were level on points with Farina, eleven points adrift of Ascari.

Entries

 — Felice Bonetto qualified and drove 25 laps of the race in the #16 Maserati. José Froilán González, whose own car had already retired, took over the car for the remainder of the race.
 — Jean Behra was initially due to drive the #22 Gordini, but, due to injuries suffered at the non-championship Pau Grand Prix, he was unable to participate, and so was replaced by Roberto Mieres.
 — Fred Wacker neither set a qualifying time nor started the race, as his engine was used by Harry Schell.

Classification

Qualifying

Race

Notes
 – 1 point for fastest lap

Shared drives
 Car #16: Felice Bonetto (25 laps) and José Froilán González (64 laps). They shared the points for 3rd place.

Championship standings after the race 
Drivers' Championship standings

Note: Only the top five positions are included.

References

External links 

Dutch Grand Prix
Dutch Grand Prix
Grand Prix
Dutch Grand Prix